The Comet tank or Tank, Cruiser, Comet I (A34) was a British cruiser tank that first saw use near the end of the Second World War, during the Western Allied invasion of Germany. The Comet was developed from the earlier Cromwell tank and mounted the new 17 pdr High Velocity (HV) (3 inch; 76.2 mm – sometimes referred to as "77  mm") gun, in a lower profile, partly-cast turret. This gun was effective against late-war German tanks, including the Panther at medium range, and the Tiger.

The Comet rendered the Cruiser Mk VIII Challenger obsolete, and led to the development of the Centurion tank. When firing APDS rounds, the 77 mm HV was superior in armour penetration capability to the 75 mm KwK 42 gun of the equivalent Axis tank, the Panther.

The Comet entered active service in January 1945 and remained in British service until 1958. In some cases, Comets sold to other countries continued to operate into the 1980s.

Design and development

Background

Combat experience against the Germans in the Western Desert Campaign demonstrated to the British many shortcomings with their cruiser tanks. Hence a request was made in 1941 for a new heavy cruiser tank that could achieve battle superiority over German models. For reasons of economy and efficiency, it had to use as many components as possible from the current A15 Mk VI Crusader tank.

The initial designs for the new Cromwell tank evolved into the A24 Mk VII Cavalier tank and the A27L Mk VIII Centaur tank, both powered by the Nuffield Liberty. Design progressed through the Mk VII (A27M) Cromwell, a third parallel development to the Cavalier and Centaur, sharing many of the same characteristics.

Under the newer A27M specification, Cromwell integrated a number of advanced features. The Meteor engine proved to be very reliable and gave the tank good mobility but some problems appeared based on the vehicle's shared heritage and significant jump in engine power. The tank was prone to throwing its tracks if track tension was not maintained properly or if it turned at too high a speed or too sharply. There were also some problems with suspension breakage, partly due to the Cromwell's high speed and it ran through a number of design changes as a result.

The biggest complaint was related to firepower; the Cromwell had originally been designed to carry the 57 mm Ordnance QF 6-pounder, also retrofitted to the Crusader tanks. In combat, these were found to be useful against other tanks but lacking any reasonable high explosive load they were ineffective against anti-tank guns or static emplacements. Prior to the Cromwell entering combat service, the Ordnance QF 75 mm was introduced which equipped the majority of Cromwells, an adapted version of the 6-pounder firing shells from the US 75 mm gun from the Sherman. This offered somewhat lower anti-tank performance than the 6-pounder but its much larger shell provided an effective high explosive load.

Several attempts had been made to further improve firepower by fitting a more powerful gun. In parallel with development of the Cromwell and QF 75 mm gun, a new Vickers High Velocity 75 mm tank gun had been designed but this proved too large for the Cromwell turret ring and left a shortage in offensive anti-tank capability. A prior requirement for a 17-pounder armed tank led to development of the A30 Mk VIII Challenger. Based on the Cromwell, the hull had to be lengthened and a much larger turret set on top to allow a second loader for the 17-pounder, a requirement of the older specification believed necessary for the larger ammunition. The very high turret of the Challenger was considered a liability and this led to experiments with the similar A30 Avenger version, an anti-tank version with an open-top turret.

Conversion of Sherman tanks to the Sherman Firefly (a Sherman tank fitted with the 17-pounder gun) was significantly faster than Challenger production and driven by operational needs of the Normandy invasion, production of Challenger was dropped. Fireflies (and the limited number of Challengers) provided additional firepower to Cromwell and Sherman armed troops. One Firefly would be issued to each troop of Cromwells (giving three Cromwells and one Sherman Firefly). Problems were encountered due to the different maintenance requirements and associated supply complication of two tank models, as well as the performance difference between Cromwell and Sherman and the Sherman's silhouette, even larger than the Challenger. The large size and obvious difference of both Challenger and Firefly made them a priority target for Axis forces.

Recognising that a common low profile vehicle was required to replace the mixed fleet of Cromwell, Challenger and Firefly tanks, a new specification of tank was created. This removed the Challenger's need for a second loader and mounted the newer Vickers High Velocity weapon intended for the Cromwell.

Tank, Cruiser, Comet l (A34)

With the A34 (the General Staff specification), later named Comet, the tank designers opted to correct some of the Cromwell's flaws in armament, track design and suspension while building upon its strengths of low height, high speed and mobility. This replaced the need for the Challenger and Firefly and acted upon the experiences gained through design and early deployment of the Cromwell.

Originally, it had been expected that the Cromwell would use the "High Velocity 75 mm" gun designed by Vickers but it would not fit into the turret. Development of the gun continued and as work commenced on the Comet, the gun design evolved into the 17 pdr HV (High Velocity). The gun now used the same calibre (76.2 mm) projectile as the 17-pounder but the cartridge case was from the older QF 3 inch 20 cwt anti-aircraft gun loaded to higher pressures. The resulting round was different from 17-pounder ammunition, being shorter, more compact and more easily stored and handled within the tank. Testing on the range by 2nd Fife and Forfarshire Yeomanry as they converted from Shermans showed that the gun did not penetrate the front armour plate of a captured German Panther tank.

The 17 pdr HV was a shortened 17-pounder. This made it possible to mount the gun on a smaller turret ring. The gun was still capable against opponents and of firing APDS rounds, more accurately and consistently than APDS from the 17-pounder and 6-pounder, which were inaccurate over 700 m and often ricocheted. The Challenger turret had been so large to allow space for two loaders.

Several other improvements were made and many Cromwell design revisions were incorporated, such as safety hatches for the driver and hull gunner. The hull was fully welded as standard and armour was increased, ranging from 32 mm to 74 mm on the hull, while the turret was from 57 to 102 mm.

A new lower-profile welded turret was created using a cast gun mantlet for the 77 mm. The turret was electrically traversed (a design feature taken from the Churchill tank), with a generator powered by the main engine rather than the hydraulic system of the Cromwell. Ammunition for the 77 mm gun was stored in armoured bins.

The Comet's suspension was strengthened, and track return rollers were added. As with later Cromwells, the Comet tank's top speed was limited from the Cromwell's 40+ mph to a slower, but respectable . This change preserved the lifespan of suspension and engine components and reduced track wear.

Similar to later Churchills, the Comet benefited from lessons learned in the co-operation of tanks with infantry. It was fitted as standard with two radio sets: a Wireless Set No. 19, for communication with the regiment and the troop, and a No. 38 Wireless for communication with infantry units. Like many British tanks, it also had a telephone handset mounted on the rear so that accompanying infantry could talk to the crew.

Production

Comet tanks were built by a number of British firms led by Leyland, including English Electric, John Fowler & Co., and Metro-Cammell.

The mild steel prototype was ready in February 1944 and entered trials. Concerns about the hull gunner and belly armour were put to one side to avoid redesign, but there was still sufficient delay caused by minor modifications and changes. Production models did not commence delivery until September 1944. The Comet was intended to be in service by December 1944, but crew training was delayed by the German Ardennes Offensive. By the end of the war, 1,200 had been produced.

Service history

Second World War

The British 11th Armoured Division was the first formation to receive the new tanks, with deliveries commencing in December 1944 and the 29th Armoured Brigade, then equipped with Shermans, was withdrawn from fighting in the southern Netherlands early in the same month for re-equipping. After arriving in Brussels and preparing to hand in their Shermans the Ardennes Offensive commenced, and the brigade was forced to hastily take back its Shermans in order to take part in the countering of the German attack. The unit returned to the Brussels area in the middle of January 1945 three weeks later and finally paid-off its Shermans in exchange for Comets. The 11th Armoured would be the only division to be completely refitted with the Comet by the end of the war. The Comet saw combat and 26 were destroyed but due to its late arrival in the war in north west Europe, it did not participate in big battles. The Comet was involved in the crossing of the Rhine and the later Berlin Victory Parade in July 1945.

Postwar era
In the post war era the Comet served alongside the heavier Centurion tank, a successor introduced in the closing days of the Second World War on an experimental basis but too late to see combat. The Comet remained in British service until 1958, when the remaining tanks were sold to foreign governments; up until the 1980s, it was used by the armies of various nations such as South Africa, which maintained several as modified recovery vehicles. Two examples were still being held in reserve by the South African Army as late as 2000.

Forty-one Comet Mk I Model Bs were also used by Finnish Defence Forces armoured brigade until 1970. The tanks were stored until 2007, when four of them were auctioned. Four Comets were delivered to the Irish Army in 1959 and a further four in 1960. Severe budget cutbacks affected the service lives of the Comets, as not enough spares were purchased. The Comet appealed to the Irish Army as it was cheap to buy and run, had low ground pressure and good anti-tank capability. However, faulty fuzes meant the withdrawal of the HE ammunition, which limited the tank's role to an anti-tank vehicle. With stocks of 77 mm ammunition dwindling in 1969, the army began an experiment to prolong the life of the vehicle. It involved replacing the turret with an open mounting with the Bofors 90 mm Pv-1110 recoilless rifle. The project was cancelled due to lack of funds. The last 77 mm Comet shoot was in 1973 with the tanks being withdrawn soon afterwards. One is preserved in the Irish Curragh Camp and two more survive in other barracks.

Cuba was also an operator of the Comet tank, with some 15 purchased from the UK before the Cuban Revolution of 1959 (which saw the fall of US-backed dictator Fulgencio Batista's regime and the beginning of Cuba being under Fidel Castro's rule). Starting in 1958, the USA began to cut off weapons sales to Cuba following an American government's decision prohibiting Cuba from  using its US-supplied armaments against pro-communist/socialist rebels under Castro throughout the country. Thus, Batista was forced to seek his buying of arms from other nations, which included the UK, which also sold about 17 Hawker Sea Fury fighter aircraft together with the Comet tanks. After the collapse of Batista's government at the end of 1958, the new Cuban government under Castro sought replacement parts and ammunition for their Comets from the British government, which promptly turned them down in conjunction with the USA's armaments blockade over Cuba. Thus, the few Comets in Cuba were soon retired from service and either scrapped or abandoned, being replaced with larger quantities of T-34/85 and T-54/55 tanks received from the Soviet Union.

Burma (as it was then known; now Myanmar) was also another user of the Comet tank, with an estimated 25 bought from their former British colonial rulers in between the late 1950s and the early 1960s. These are still being operated and even took part in their Armed Forces Day held last 27 March 2021.

Operators
 :15
 :41
 :8
 :25
 :5
 :26

Variants

There were two Comet hull versions:

 Type A
 With the exhaust venting through the top rear of the vehicle engine deck similar to Cromwell. These could be fitted with cowls to redirect exhaust fumes away from the air inlet vents. Cowls were usually split into two independent covers, as opposed to the single cover fitted to Cromwell.

 Type B
 A post-war update with twin fishtail exhaust pipes exiting through holes in the rear-facing armoured plate. Cowls were no longer required. Early Type B Comets had armoured covers over the holes through which the fishtail exhaust pipes would protrude, retaining the older Model A setup.

Other vehicles that were based upon the Comet:

Comet Crocodile
One surviving photo shows a Comet Crocodile. This mounted a flamethrower and towed a fuel trailer similar to the Churchill Crocodile. Little is known about it.

Comet 20pdr
Finland is said to have experimentally modified a single Comet with an adapted turret to carry the 20pdr gun.  A single blurry photo has been found.  This was presumably for compatibility with the Charioteers also operated by Finland. As far as is known it did not see service.

Armoured Maintenance Vehicle
The Comet was used by South Africa as the basis of a maintenance vehicle to support their Olifant Mk1A main battle tank (a variant of the Centurion). It had a crew of four and had a mass of 20 metric tons. It was powered by an AVI-1790-8 Continental, V12 90°, air cooled, fuel injection engine producing 615kW (852 hP), through an Allison CD 850 automatic three speed (low, high, reverse) transmission and had a maximum speed of 60 km/h. For its maintenance task it featured a welding machine, a hydrovane (high pressure air and water), a crane (1.5 to 6 metric tons), spare lubricants, 200l water, cutting facilities and carried a spare engine for the Olifant Mk1A. It was also fitted with six smoke grenade launchers (four rearward facing and four forward facing) for self defence.

FV4401 Contentious
The Comet was used as the basis for the experimental FV4401 Contentious, an air-transportable self-propelled anti-tank gun mounting a 105mm L7 gun in an open mounting on the shortened hull of a Comet, and using the vehicle's hydraulic suspension system to adjust elevation, similar to the method used on the Swedish S-Tank. One or two prototypes were built and tested before the entire project was cancelled.

Survivors 
Some surviving vehicles can be seen in a number of places including:
 1 Special Service Battalion near Bloemfontein, South Africa, has one Type A, with a single cowling, on display.
 The American Heritage Museum in Stow, Massachusetts, USA has one in running order.
 The German Tank Museum, Munster.
 The Military Museum Lešany, has one comet tank on display.
 The Hong Kong Museum of Coastal Defence has a Comet on display.
 The Imperial War Museum Duxford has a Comet in its Land Warfare Hall.
 Johannesburg Light Horse Regiment in Johannesburg, South Africa has one Type B on display.
 The Muckleburgh Collection, Norfolk.
 The Musée des Blindés has a Comet on display.
 Queen Nandi Mounted Rifles in Durban, South Africa has one Type B on display.
 The Parola Tank Museum in Finland has three Comets: two on display (one was used as a target dummy) and one in running order.
 Pretoria Armoured Regiment in Pretoria, South Africa has one Type B on display.
 The South African Armour Museum at School of Armour has two (a Type A and B), plus an Armoured Maintenance Vehicle variant on display.
 The South African National Museum of Military History has one on display.
 The Tank Museum, Bovington, UK has at least three Comets, one in drivable condition
 Celerity at the House of Tanks in Wichita, Kansas

See also

 FV4101 Charioteer - heavily armed cruiser tank also based on the Cromwell

Tanks of comparable role, performance, and era
 M4A3 (76) Sherman  – medium tank armed with an 76 mm anti-tank  gun, entered US service in 1944
 Panther – medium tank, entered German service in 1943.
 Sherman Firefly – US-built M4/M4A4 Sherman re-armed with a 17-pdr anti-tank gun at a UK Royal Ordinance Factory, entered service in 1944.
 T-34-85 – medium tank, entered Soviet service in 1944.
 Type 4 Chi-To – prototype Japanese medium tank, never entered service.

Explanatory notes

Citations

General and cited sources
 
 
 
 
 
 Comet WWIIVehicles.com

External links

 Comet Cruiser Tank (A.34)—British Equipment of the Second World War (detailed Comet specifications and performance data)
 Comet Walk Arounds on Prime Portal
 OnWar specifications
 Bolton IPMS (Comet pictures)
 Modellismopiu Gallery (Comet gallery 1)
 Modellismopiu Gallery (Comet gallery 2)
 Modellismopiu Gallery (Comet gallery 3)

Cruiser tanks of the United Kingdom
World War II tanks of the United Kingdom
Military vehicles introduced from 1940 to 1944
Leyland vehicles